Brașovia Fortress was a fortification located on the saddle of Tâmpa mountain at Brașov, Romania. John Hunyadi had it demolished by the beginning of 1455.

Notes

Buildings and structures in Brașov County
Castles in Romania
Historic monuments in Brașov County